Source is a 3D game engine developed by Valve. It debuted as the successor to GoldSrc in 2004 with the release of Counter-Strike: Source and Half-Life 2. Updates to Source were released in incremental versions, with the engine being succeeded by Source 2 by the late 2010s.

History
Source distantly originates from the GoldSrc engine, itself a heavily modified version of John Carmack's Quake engine with some code from the Quake II engine. Carmack commented on his blog in 2004 that "there are still bits of early Quake code in Half-Life 2". Valve employee Erik Johnson explained the engine's nomenclature on the Valve Developer Community:

Source was developed part-by-part from this fork onwards, slowly replacing GoldSrc in Valve's internal projects and, in part, explaining the reasons behind its unusually modular nature. Valve's development of Source since has been a mixture of licensed middleware and in-house-developed code. Among others, Source uses Bink Video for video playback.

Modularity and notable updates
Source was created to evolve incrementally with new technology, as opposed to the backward compatibility-breaking "version jumps" of its competitors. Different systems within Source are represented by separate modules which can be updated independently. With Steam, Valve can distribute these updates automatically among its many users. In practice, however, there have been occasional breaks in this chain of compatibility. The release of Half-Life 2: Episode One and The Orange Box both introduced new versions of the engine that could not be used to run older games or mods without the developers performing upgrades to code and, in some cases, content. Both cases required markedly less work to update its version than competing engines.

Source 2006

The Source 2006 branch was the term used for Valve's games using technology that culminated with the release of Half-Life 2: Episode One. HDR rendering and color correction were first implemented in 2005 using Day of Defeat: Source, which required the engine's shaders to be rewritten. The former, along with developer commentary tracks, were showcased in Half-Life 2: Lost Coast.  Episode One introduced Phong shading and other smaller features. Image-based rendering technology had been in development for Half-Life 2, but was cut from the engine before its release. It was mentioned again by Gabe Newell in 2006 as a piece of technology he would like to add to Source to implement support for much larger scenes that are impossible with strictly polygonal objects.

Source 2007
The Source 2007 branch represented a full upgrade of the Source engine for the release of The Orange Box. An artist-driven, threaded particle system replaced previously hard-coded effects for all of the games within. An in-process tools framework was created to support it, which also supported the initial builds of Source Filmmaker. In addition, the facial animation system was made hardware-accelerated on modern video cards for "feature film and broadcast television" quality. The release of The Orange Box on multiple platforms allowed for a large code refactoring, which let the Source engine take advantage of multiple CPU cores. However, support on the PC was experimental and unstable until the release of Left 4 Dead. Multiprocessor support was later backported to Team Fortress 2 and Day of Defeat: Source. Valve created the Xbox 360 release of The Orange Box in-house, and support for the console is fully integrated into the main engine codeline. It includes asset converters, cross-platform play and Xbox Live integration. Program code can be ported from PC to Xbox 360 simply by recompiling it. The PlayStation 3 release was outsourced to Electronic Arts, and was plagued with issues throughout the process. Gabe Newell cited these issues when criticizing the console during the release of The Orange Box.

Left 4 Dead branch
The Left 4 Dead branch is an overhaul of many aspects of the Source engine through the development of the Left 4 Dead series. Multiprocessor support was further expanded, allowing for features like split screen multiplayer, additional post-processing effects, event scripting with Squirrel, and the highly-dynamic AI Director. The menu interface was re-implemented with a new layout designed to be more console-oriented. This branch later fueled the releases of Alien Swarm and Portal 2, the former released with source code outlining many of the changes made since the branch began. Portal 2, in addition, served as the result of Valve taking the problem of porting to PlayStation 3 in-house, and in combination with Steamworks integration creating what they called "the best console version of the game".

OS X, Linux, and Android support
In April 2010, Valve released all of their major Source games on OS X, coinciding with the release of the Steam client on the same platform. Valve announced that all their future games would be released simultaneously for Windows and Mac. The first of Valve's games to support Linux was Team Fortress 2, the port released in October 2012 along with the closed beta of the Linux version of Steam. Both the OS X and Linux ports of the engine take advantage of OpenGL and are powered by Simple DirectMedia Layer. During the process of porting, Valve rearranged most of the games released up to The Orange Box into separate, but parallel "singleplayer" and "multiplayer" branches. The game code to these branches was made public to mod developers in 2013, and they serve as the current stable release of Source designated for mods. Support for Valve's internal Steam Pipe distribution system as well as the Oculus Rift are included. In May 2014, Nvidia released ports of Portal and Half-Life 2 to their Tegra 4-based Android handheld game console Nvidia Shield.

Tools and resources

Source SDK
Source SDK is the software development kit for the Source engine, and contains many of the tools used by Valve to develop assets for their games. It comes with several command-line programs designed for special functions within the asset pipeline, as well as a few GUI-based programs designed for handling more complex functions. Source SDK was launched as a free standalone toolset through Steam, and required a Source game to be purchased on the same account. Since the release of Left 4 Dead in late 2008, Valve began releasing "Authoring Tools" for individual games, which constitute the same programs adapted for each game's engine build. After Team Fortress 2 became free-to-play, Source SDK was effectively made open to all Steam users. When some Source games were updated to Source 2013, the older Source SDKs were phased out. The three applications mentioned below are now included in the install of each game.

There are three applications packaged in the Source SDK: Hammer Editor, Model Viewer, and Face Poser. The Model Viewer is a program that allows users to view models and can be used for a variety of different purposes, including development. Developers may use the program to view models and their corresponding animations, attachment points, bones, and so on. Face Poser is the tool used to access facial animations and choreography systems.  This tool allows one to edit facial expressions, gestures and movements for characters, lip sync speech, and sequence expressions and other acting cues and preview what the scene will look like in the game engine.

Hammer Editor

The Hammer Editor, the engine's official level editor, uses rendering and compiling tools included in the SDK to create maps using the binary space partitioning (BSP) method. Level geometry is created with 3D polygons called brushes; each face can be assigned a texture which also defines the properties of the surface such as the sounds used for footsteps. Faces can also be converted into a displacement allowing for more natural shapes such as hills to be created.

Scenery objects or complex geometry can be imported as separate 3D models from the game directory. These models can also be used as physics objects or interactive props. The editor also features an in-depth logic I/O system that can be used to create complex interactive elements. Signals to trigger different responses or change the state of an entity can be sent between entities such as buttons, NPCs, intangible trigger brushes, and map props.

Source Dedicated Server
The Source Dedicated Server (SRCDS) is a standalone launcher for the Source engine that runs multiplayer game sessions without requiring a client. It can be launched through Windows or Linux and can allow for custom levels and assets. Most third-party servers additionally run Metamod:Source and SourceMod, which together provide a framework on top of SRCDS for custom modification of gameplay on existing titles.

Source Filmmaker

The Source Filmmaker (SFM) is a video capture and editing application that works from within the Source engine. Developed by Valve, the tool was originally used to create movies for Day of Defeat: Source and Team Fortress 2. It was also used to create some trailers for Source Engine games. The software was released to the public in 2012.

Destinations Workshop Tools
In June 2016, Valve released the Destinations Workshop Tools, a set of free virtual reality (VR) creation tools running using the Source 2 SDK.

Valve Developer Community
In June 2005, Valve opened the Valve Developer Community (VDC) wiki. VDC replaced Valve's static Source SDK documentation with a full MediaWiki-powered community site.

Academic papers
Valve staff have occasionally produced professional and/or academic papers for various events and publications, including SIGGRAPH, Game Developer Magazine and Game Developers Conference, explaining various aspects of Source engine's development.

Games using Source

Titanfall, Titanfall 2, and Apex Legends are not included because their engines, while originally based on the Source SDK, were modified to the point that they are effectively different engines.

Source 2
A successor to Source, Source 2, was announced by Valve at the Game Developers Conference in March 2015. There, Valve stated that it would be free to use for developers, with support for the Vulkan graphical API, as well as using a new in-house physics engine called Rubikon. In June 2015, Valve announced that Dota 2, originally made in the Source engine, would be ported over to Source 2 in an update called Dota 2 Reborn. Reborn was first released to the public as an opt-in beta update that same month before officially replacing the original client in September 2015, making it the first game to use the engine. The engine had succeeded Source by the late 2010s.

See also 

 First-person shooter engine
 List of Source engine mods

Notes

References 

 
2004 software
Game engines for Linux
Proprietary software
Video game engines